Swimming to Sea is a 2012 South Korean adult computer-animated musical drama film written and directed by Dae-Hee Lee. It stars Hyen-jee Kim, Young-jun Si, Young-mi Ahn, Kyeng-soo Hyen and Ho-san Lee. It premiered at the 2012 Jeonju International Film Festival, and was released on July 25, 2012 to South Korean theaters. It was later distributed on Steam on June 6, 2016 as Padak by the comic book publisher eigoMANGA.

It received mixed reviews from South Korean critics but later received acclaim from international critics, as of 2020, this is the only adult animated film released by CJ Entertainment to date.

Plot 
A mackerel from the ocean is placed in the fish tank of a seafood restaurant in a Korean fishing village. She is driven to escape after witnessing another mackerel being prepared as food. Her tank is co-inhabited by a group of farm fish consisting of a striped beakfish named Bream, a snapper named Nollaemi, a sleepy sea bass named Bar, a saltwater eel named Jooldom and the youthful greenling named Spotty. They are ruled by an old flatfish, whom they refer to as "The Master", who hides underneath a grate and instructs the tank's fish to prolong their survival by playing dead when humans approach the restaurant. The fish derive sustenance from dead and dying fish that are periodically dropped into their tank. After witnessing the mackerel leap out of the tank in an unsuccessful escape attempt, the shocked farm fish christen her with the nickname "Padak Padak" (or "Flappy"). Each night, the Master, who falsely claims to also be from the ocean, gives riddles to the farm fish loosely based on stories of the ocean told to him by a mate who had been eaten before him.

Following a violent confrontation between Flappy and the Master, Jooldom grants Flappy permission to provide the night's riddle. Flappy uses the opportunity to encourage the group to ponder a means of escape. Bar proposes that the king crabs in the tank below theirs are able to break the glass walls, and can be convinced to do so by Flappy, who can speak their language. The night's meeting ends with Flappy being beaten by the group after she questions the Master's authority. The next day, as the restaurant's tanks are being cleaned, Flappy and Spotty make another unsuccessful escape attempt, in which Flappy abandons her own effort when Spotty's progress is impeded. That night, Flappy, in spite of her hunger and out of stubborn pride against the Master, declines to join in devouring a dying halibut, who mocks the Master's cowardice before his death. Flappy leaps into the king crab tank, where she is nearly killed until a young boy mischievously scoops her out of the tank and places her in the restaurant's aquarium. The starved Flappy devours all but one of the aquarium's clownfish before injuring herself on a knight decoration's sword and losing consciousness.

Spotty's own attempt to speak to the king crabs in their tank results in his death, and his body is placed in the farm fish's tank. As the Master suddenly defends Spotty's body from being devoured by Jooldom, Flappy is returned to the tank as well, and she attacks the Master after seeing him over Spotty's mutilated corpse, thinking he was the one who killed him. Their struggle is cut short when the Master is scooped by the restaurant chef and placed on his counter. As the chef prepares other dishes, the Master witnesses the happenings within the restaurant and begins fearing for his life, only to be spared when the customer changes his order to mackerel. When the Master is returned to the tank, Flappy apologizes to him for her misunderstanding and encourages him to move forward before she is taken and served ikizukuri-style. The next morning, the Master makes his own leap outside the tank, and with the aid of the sword fragment that had been embedded into Flappy, he escapes the chef's clutch and successfully reaches the sea as the rest of the fish watch from the tank.

Cast 
 Hyen-jee Kim as Padak / Flappy 
 Young-jun Si as Master Oldfish
 Kyeng-soo Hyen as Bream
 Young-mi Ahn as Spotty and Nollaemi
 Ho-san Lee as Jooldom and Bar

Production 
The movie was originally intended to be in 2D because the director believed they couldn't get the facial features right with 3D. However it would take too long to do in 2D and he realized that 3D animation could get the desired results.

References

External links 
 

2012 animated films
2012 films
CJ Entertainment films
Films about cannibalism
Films about fish
2010s Korean-language films
South Korean animated films
Adult animated films
South Korean psychological thriller films
South Korean thriller drama films
South Korean psychological horror films
South Korean horror films
2010s psychological drama films
2010s psychological thriller films
2010s psychological horror films
2010s horror thriller films
2012 drama films
2010s musical films
2010s South Korean films